Ismamut Ata is a mausoleum in the Khwarazm oasis of Turkmenistan. A cluster of religious structures, it stands amidst a graveyard and was once considered to be among the most prominent shrines in Turkestan.

Geography 
Ismamut Ata lies 13 km south of Görogly.

History 
In Turkmen folklore, Ism — a companion of Muhammad— had introduced Islam into the region for the first time, convincing the local Sultan Mahmut. On Ism's death, Mahmut commissioned the mausoleum, which bore the portmanteau Ism-i Maḥmūt, anglicized to Ismamut. However, there is no historical corroboration of either Ism or Mahmut; the identity of the buried figure remains unknown.

It is also believed that these lands were the grazing grounds of Duldul, the mule of Muhammad. This gave rise to a tradition of Turkmen tying their horses to a tree, a few hundred meters away from the site, and circumambulating it three times to seek Duldul's protection.

Site 
The main complex oversees a courtyard. The oldest building in the complex can be dated to c. 16th century.

First comes a series of twin-floored domed rooms with a fireplace and an intricately carved wooden door, in what is understood to have been a pilgrim's quarter or madrasa. On one side of the courtyard stands the Summer Mosque. To its right is the remnants of a kitchen and to its left, a covered rectangular enclosure with two tapered pillars. Beyond the Summer mosque, is the Winter Mosque, a domed tetraconch building with latticed windows. 

On the east of the mosque complex, is the daskeche — a carpeted corridor, with seven white domes — with niches along the wall. One end of it connects to the Winter Mosque by a four-domed flank-corridor whereas the other end leads to the mausoleum via an anteroom. The cenotaph is housed in a locked chamber; it is only visible from the windows of the prayer-room.

Tourism 
The site attracts tourists; rooms have proferred along the complex, offering overnight accommodation. Paul Brummell quips that the tradition of circumambulation continues except that the horses have been replaced by motor cars.

References

Further reading 
 For late twentieth century photographs, consult 
 For late nineteenth century photographs, consult 
On Soviet management of these sites and related historiography, consult 

Shrines in Turkmenistan